The ICP Amigo is an Italian homebuilt aircraft that was designed and produced by ICP srl of Piovà Massaia. When it was available the aircraft was supplied as a kit for amateur construction.

Production was ended and, as of January 2013, the Amigo is no longer listed by ICP as one of their current products.

Design and development
The aircraft features a cantilever low-wing, a two-seats-in-side-by-side configuration enclosed cockpit, fixed tricycle landing gear with wheel pants and a single engine in tractor configuration.

The aircraft is made from aluminum sheet.

Specifications (Amigo)

See also
HB-Flugtechnik Amigo, a different aircraft with the same model name

References

External links
Photo of ICP Amigo

Cougar 001
1990s Italian sport aircraft
1990s Italian civil utility aircraft
Single-engined tractor aircraft
Low-wing aircraft
Homebuilt aircraft